Neighbours is an Australian television soap opera. It was first broadcast on 18 March 1985 and currently airs on digital channel Eleven. The following is a list of characters that appeared in the soap in 2016, by order of first appearance. All characters are introduced by the show's executive producer Jason Herbison. The 32nd season of Neighbours began airing from 4 January 2016. Julie Quill and Xanthe Canning were introduced during the same month. March saw the first appearance of Jacka Hills. Jack Callahan, Ned Willis and Madison Robinson arrived in April, while Angus Beaumont-Hannay, Walter Mitchell and Mandy Franze made their debuts in May. August saw the arrival of James Udagawa, while brothers David and Leo Tanaka were introduced in September, along with Xanthe's mother Brooke Butler.

Julie Quill

Julie Quill, played by Gail Easdale, made her first screen appearance on 12 January 2016. The character and Easdale's casting was announced on 4 January. The actress revealed that she had previously auditioned for another role on the show in 2015, but was unsuccessful. She was then asked to play Julie and she accepted. The role marks Easdale's return to acting after a break to raise her children. She is also the wife of Stefan Dennis, who portrays Paul Robinson. Julie was introduced as the new owner of Lassiter's Hotel and Paul's enemy. Easdale described Julie as being "a hard nut, but she also has a softer side because she has worked hard and she appreciates others that put in the effort." Easdale said Julie was forced to make an impact in a male dominated environment, which she admired. She added that Paul was "a great character to play against", which made her guest stint more interesting as Dennis is different at home. The character is later exposed as the perpetrator behind the Lassiters Hotel explosion, which resulted in the deaths of Josh Willis (Harley Bonner) and Doug Willis (Terence Donovan) and she departs in June 2016. Easdale reprises the role on 8 September 2021, as Terese Willis (Rebekah Elmaloglou) visits Julie in prison in a bid to gain closure over the death of her son. Julie's return follows the introduction of her own son Jesse Porter (Cameron Robbie) in March 2021. Of her return and how Julie has changed, Easdale stated: "It's always great doing any role, but to be able to be Julie in the familiar surroundings of Erinsborough makes it that much more fun. Julie has reflected on her past deeds, making her a changed, remorseful character since the last time you saw her."

Julie comes to Erinsborough to inspect Lassiter's hotel, the Quill Group's newest acquisition. Julie holds a grudge against the hotel's previous owner Paul Robinson, following a failed romance between them. When she learns Paul's nephew Daniel (Tim Phillipps) has applied for a job at the hotel, she turns him down after an interview. Julie discusses her struggles as a woman in the hotel industry with Terese Willis, and she decides to hire Daniel after realising that he and Paul have fallen out. She tells Terese that if there are problems, she will be held responsible. Julie returns a few weeks later for a meeting with Terese, and she clashes with Paul again. She later reveals to Terese her plans for a second hotel tower to be built on existing businesses within the Lassiter's complex. Julie becomes determined to ruin Paul's bid to host the Erinsborough Citizen of the Year event. She manages to persuade the council to hold the launch party at The Waterhole, but Paul arranges a job offer for the Lassiter's chef, causing him to quit before the launch. Harold's Store does the catering and leaves Julie, the guests and Mayor Sonya Rebecchi (Eve Morey) with food poisoning. Robinson's Motel is awarded the ceremony.

Julie meets with her stepson Tom Quill (Kane Felsinger) to discuss the progress of the second tower. Tom informs Julie that he has persuaded those opposed to the development to withdraw their objections. When Robinson's loses its liquor license, Lassiter's regains the Citizen of the Year event and Julie gloats to Paul. She also puts pressure on Tom to sort the environmental report for the tower by replacing any negative report with a more positive version. When Tom's deception is later exposed, Julie disowns him. Shortly after, the boiler room at Lassiter's explodes, destroying the hotel. Julie moves in with Terese, who is grieving for her son Josh Willis, and learns that Tom is missing and possibly buried under the hotel rubble. She hires Sarah Beaumont (Nicola Charles) to take over Lassiter's while Terese takes leave. Julie attacks Paul as he is accused of causing the explosion, and when he tries to comfort her she accuses him of assault. Tom turns up alive, and Julie is angry with Aaron Brennan (Matt Wilson) for lying to her as he attacked Tom just before the explosion. Julie fires Terese when it transpires that she paid someone to give a false alibi, ensuring Paul was put away. At the reopening of Lassiter's, Julie is arrested by Mark Brennan (Scott McGregor), as John Doe's (Andrew James Morley) memory returns, and he recalls that he saw her conspire with Jacka Hills (Brad McMurray) to cause the explosion. Mark charges Julie and she attempts to apologise to Terese and her family. Terese's daughter, Piper Willis (Mavournee Hazel) slaps her and Terese refuses to forgive Julie. Mark then takes Julie away, and she is later sentenced to ten years in prison. Five years later, Julie's son Jesse Porter starts working for Lassiters in a bid to gain information for Shay, who is trying to repair the damage to the Quill Group's reputation.

Xanthe Canning

Xanthe Canning, played by Lilly Van der Meer, made her first screen appearance on 22 January 2016. The character and casting was announced on 30 November 2015. Colette Mann, who plays Sheila Canning, teased Xanthe's introduction during an October 2015 interview. She commented that the new arrival would start "a big new storyline" for the family. Of Van der Meer's casting, Mann said "Lilly's world has certainly been opened up since joining the show and we're loving having her here. She was already a Canning after just a couple of weeks, we had converted her." Xanthe is Sheila's granddaughter, the half-sister of Kyle Canning (Chris Milligan), and daughter of Gary Canning (Damien Richardson). Van der Meer said Xanthe would make "a good friend" on Ramsay Street, and that she would get into "trouble, excitement, and mischief."

Jacka Hills

Jackson Derek "Jacka" Hills, played by Brad McMurray, made his first screen appearance on 7 March 2016. Jacka is an old friend of Stephanie Scully (Carla Bonner). He was billed as the show's "newest villain" and a writer for the official website said with "trouble brewing", Jacka would be in the middle of it. McMurray enjoyed playing the role, saying "It's a great show to be a part of and I'm quite adept at playing the bad guy so this is really a lot of fun. I love causing trouble and there are definitely a few surprises in store where Jacka is concerned." Following his original guest stint, the character returned in September. Jacka asks Steph to visit him in prison, after learning that his wife Regan Davis (Sabeena Manalis) might be having an affair. Steph agrees to speak to Regan to find out the truth. In 2022, script producer Shane Isheev confirmed a planned return for Jacka, however the storyline was unable to be pursued due to the cancellation of Neighbours. The storyline would have seen Jacka meeting with David Tanaka (Takaya Honda) in prison and an earthquake causing a "mass prison breakout", leaving villains to "wreak havoc on the show." Isheev also called Jacka one of the serial's "iconic villains".

Steph Scully recognises her old friend Jacka, after he pulls his bike up alongside her and Mark Brennan (Scott McGregor). Steph suggests they round up their old friends for a beer and a talk. When Jacka mentions that they have been kicked out of their usual place, Steph invites them to Robinsons Motel. Paul Robinson (Stefan Dennis) voices his displeasure at having a gang of bikers at the motel and asks them to leave. Unhappy at the way Paul spoke to Steph, Jacka and the group return to trash the room and steal Paul's prosthetic leg. A few weeks later, Jacka leaves some boxes of alcohol at Robinsons for Steph. Mark Brennan recognises that they are stolen. Steph confronts Jacka and he warns her not to tell the police about his connection to the alcohol. However, Mark has already called it in. In retaliation, Jacka sprays graffiti over the motel's entrance. He is later seen leaving the scene of the explosion at Lassiter's Hotel with a cash box. Steph approaches Jacka to do some investigating into the explosion for her and Paul. Jacka refuses, as he is convinced Steph is trying to set him up. Jacka calls someone to let them know that no one knows he placed the hotel's blue prints in Paul's briefcase. Due to their gang connections, Jacka is revealed to be old friends with Ned Willis (Ben Hall). Jacka goes to Robinson's Motel where he wipes Paul's list of suspects from the whiteboard. Paul later contacts him about buying a fake passport to escape the country, in exchange for money. Jacks tells someone the phone that he will make sure the passport does not get Paul past immigration. Later, he is seen talking to the same person on the phone and laughing at Paul's prison sentence. It soon emerges that hotel owner Julie Quill (Gail Easedale) planned to pay him $10,000 to blow up the Lassiter's boiler to claim the insurance payout. Jacka did so, but Julie refused to pay him afterwards, once they found out that there were fatalities. Jacka is arrested and taken into police custody.

Months later, Jacka asks Steph to visit him. He believes his wife, Regan Davis, is having an affair and he wants Steph to find out who it was with. After speaking with Regan, Steph returns to the prison and tells Jacka that Regan thought they were having an affair before he was jailed, which is why she stopped visiting him. Steph explains that she set Regan straight and Regan will visit him soon. Jacka then reveals that he had someone else check up on Regan and he thinks Steph is lying. He tells her to get him a name. Regan later tells him that she was having an affair with Ned. Jacka is released early to care for his dying mother and he returns to Erinsborough to get revenge on Ned. He watches Ned with Elly Conway (Jodi Anasta) and later finds her at The Waterhole. He introduces himself to her as JD and buys her several drinks. Ned sees them together and pulls Elly away, telling her who Jacka really is. Terese Willis (Rebekah Elmaloglou) then asks for him to be removed. Steph confronts Jacka and urges him to give up his revenge plan. Jacka breaks into Number 32 and poisons Ned's tattoo ink. He breaks in again, and is almost caught by Brad Willis (Kip Gamblin) and Toadfish Rebecchi (Ryan Moloney). After learning that some of Ned's family and Elly are going up in a hot-air balloon, Jacka tampers with the gas cylinders, causing it to crash. At the hospital, Jacka learns that Regan died as a result of the balloon crash and he accuses Karl Kennedy (Alan Fletcher) of killing her. Jacka is then arrested, and he is later sentenced to eighteen years in prison.

Jack Callahan

Jack Callahan (also John Doe), played by Andrew Morley, made his first screen appearance on 4 April 2016. The character and Morley's casting details were announced on 30 January 2016. Morley received a call from his manager asking him to record an audition tape while he was in Cambodia helping to raise money for charity. Upon his return to Melbourne, Morley was offered the role. He began filming in December 2015. Morley's character was initially billed as having "a mysterious past" and no family connection to Erinsborough. Morley commented that it was "an interesting start" for his character, dubbed John Doe. John befriends Paige Smith (Olympia Valance) as she tries to help him. It later emerges that his real name is Jack Callahan and he is a Catholic priest. Jack decides to stay in Erinsborough, but finds it hard as he is forced to choose between Paige and God.

Ned Willis

Ned Willis, played by Ben Hall, made his first screen appearance on 6 April 2016. Hall's casting was announced on 11 March 2016, while the character has been referred to for several years following his off-screen birth. Following his initial guest stint, Hall later returned to filming and Ned returned on 10 August. Ned is the son of Brad Willis (Kip Gamblin) and Beth Brennan (Natalie Imbruglia). His introduction united all of Brad's children on-screen for the first time. Hall explained that Ned has been living with his grandparents in Darwin. Ned is a tattoo artist and Hall commented that it would lead to some "mischief". He also described Ned as being "very complex" and "quite manipulative", adding "he has had a bit to deal with and it's really interesting how his story line pans out." The character will be reintroduced as a regular on 20 June 2018.

Madison Robinson

Madison Robinson, played by Sarah Ellen, made her first screen appearance on 22 April 2016. Ellen's casting was announced on 20 February, while Madison has previously been mentioned by other characters following her off-screen birth in 1995. Ellen filmed her guest appearance in the same month, but producers have said that she could return on a more permanent basis in the future. Of the casting, series producer Jason Herbison said "we always knew the character of Madison would appear in the Neighbours universe at some point and I'm thrilled to have cast Sarah in the role." Madison returned on 24 June and remained until 27 September, departing during scenes filmed on the Gold Coast. Ellen received on-screen credit for flashback scenes featuring Madison on 10 October 2019.

Madison is the younger child of iconic Neighbours couple Scott (Jason Donovan) and Charlene Robinson (Kylie Minogue). She comes to Erinsborough to check up on her brother Daniel (Tim Phillipps), on behalf of their parents. To help her prepare for the role, Ellen watched footage of her on-screen parents. She commented, "I watched a lot of episodes with Charlene and she was a very feisty and adventurous character and I think Madison has definitely inherited a few of those characteristics." Madison is "a budding journalist". Holly Byrnes from the Herald Sun described her as a "stylish teen". On 22 August, Byrnes colleague Nui Te Koha reported that Ellen had wrapped her guest stint and would be pursuing new roles in Hollywood. Ellen commented, "Neighbours is such a great training ground. I feel like I could easily walk on to another set and it would be a breeze."

When no one answers the door of Number 24 Ramsay Street, Madison attempts to enter through an open window. When she is pulled down by her brother Daniel, she punches him. They get reacquainted with each other and Madison reveals that she has come down from Brisbane on behalf of their parents, following Daniel's announcement that he will marry Imogen Willis (Ariel Kaplan). Daniel tells Madison that he and Imogen are marrying so they can go to the United States. Madison lends some of her clothes to Daniel's neighbour Xanthe Canning (Lily Van der Meer). When she later enquires about Xanthe's photo shoot, Xanthe is disheartened by the pictures, but Madison tells her not to be. Daniel and Imogen's marriage license comes through and Daniel tells Madison that they will marry in secret the following day. When Imogen's parents learn about the wedding, they get Madison to tell them where it is happening. Daniel and Imogen are persuaded to hold the wedding at home in front of their family and friends. After they leave town, Madison decides to stay and speak to her uncle Paul Robinson (Stefan Dennis), who had been accused of causing the Lassiter's Hotel explosion. Madison tells Paul that she believes in him, as he had once taken her family out to dinner and told the waiter she was going to be the next Ita Buttrose. Madison explains that Paul is one of her heroes and she refuses to lose faith in him. After encouraging Paul to continue looking at the evidence, she leaves for Brisbane.

Paul is imprisoned for the explosion, but several months later, is found innocent when the police charge Julie Quill (Gail Easdale). When he is freed, Paul frames a trainee reporter for the West Waratah Star for writing a bad article about him and uses it to blackmail the editor into hiring Madison as a cadet at the paper. She takes the opportunity, flying to Erinsborough and abandoning a boyfriend and university plans. Paul urges Madison to write a feature about the locals, and he later alters some of the profiles so they become personal attacks. Paul's actions are soon discovered and Madison moves out of Paul's motel to live with Terese Willis (Rebekah Elmaloglou). As an apology, Paul tells Madison about another story involving the new cleaning company at Lassiter's, who used to employ ladies in lingerie. Madison discovers that her cousin Amy Williams (Zoe Cramond) worked for the company and tells her editor that she no longer wants to write the article. She is fired from the paper, so Terese hires Madison as her assistant. Madison encourages Terese to put in a bid for Lassiter's. When her aunt Lucy Robinson (Melissa Bell) accepts the offer, Madison flies to New York with her to oversee the paperwork on Terese's behalf. When singer Rhonda Riley (Shayne Francis) is late for her performance at The Waterhole, Madison is encouraged to take her place. Aaron Brennan (Matt Wilson) later arranges for her to perform again. Xanthe assumes Madison is dating Ben Kirk (Felix Mallard) when she sees them together, and her grandmother Sheila Canning (Colette Mann) fires Madison from The Waterhole. It soon emerges that Ben is working on a song for Xanthe with Madison's help. Madison receives an audition for a singing residency at Lassiter's Gold Coast courtesy of Lucy. At SeaWorld, Madison unexpectedly meets her former boyfriend Logan Dunne (Nick Slater), who she thought had gone to California. She confronts him about their break-up and learns that he did not receive her texts, as he threw his phone off a bridge. He also explains that he does not have a new girlfriend and that he still loves her. Madison is late to the audition, but impresses the judges is offered the job. She decides to give it up to accompany Logan to California, but he tells her that he will stay on the Gold Coast with her.

Angus Beaumont-Hannay

Angus Beaumont-Hannay, played by Jai Waetford, made his first screen appearance on 2 May 2016. Waetford's casting was announced on 10 February, but his character's identity was initially kept secret. He later revealed to Angus O'Loughlin of the Hit 30 radio show that his character was called Angus. Of his casting, Waetford said "I am super excited to be joining the Neighbours team. It's my first TV role and I am looking forward to spending time on set, learning new things and meeting new people." Waetford had a guest contract with the show. Waetford's character was initially billed as the "rebellious" son of "a controversial Erinsborough character." It was later revealed that Angus is Sarah Beaumont's (Nicola Charles) son. The show's series producer Jason Herbison commented that Waetford would have fun with his character, who pushes boundaries. Following Waetford's initial guest stint, he later returned to filming with the cast on the Gold Coast.

Angus comes to Australia after being expelled from his boarding school. He believes he is taking a holiday with his mother Sarah, but she tells him he is staying with her friends Karl (Alan Fletcher) and Susan Kennedy (Susan Kennedy) in Erinsborough while she goes to Germany for business. Angus clashes with Ben Kirk (Felix Mallard), after he finds and steals some money that Ben hid in his guitar case. Angus wants to leave, until he meets Xanthe Canning (Lily Van der Meer). Angus continues to feud with Ben, who later accuses him of planting matches and lighter fluid in his locker. Ben punches Angus in front of Xanthe and Susan. When Angus learns Xanthe has not prepared for an exam, he sets off the fire alarm. When Susan confronts him, he denies it was him. Angus buys Xanthe concert tickets and while sheltering from a storm, they kiss. When her friends fail to turn up for her 16th birthday party, Xanthe plans to make the day memorable by having sex with Angus. But after her grandmother Sheila (Colette Mann) stops them, Angus tells Xanthe that they are not right for each other and he ends their romance. Angus also tells Susan that he set off the fire alarm.

Angus also sprays graffiti on the wall at the high school, but is not punished, which angers Ben and they fight again. Angus overhears Ben asking Susan why he was allowed to get away with his bad behaviour and Angus asks Karl if he is his father. Karl assures Angus that he is not. Angus becomes involved when Tom Quill (Kane Felsinger) demands that Xanthe and Ben pay back the money they took from his hotel room. Aaron Brennan (Matt Wilson) helps them out with a clothes sale, while they also form a band so they can go busking. Angus learns from Xanthe that his mother has cancer, so he takes the money that Ben and Xanthe made busking and runs away. They find Angus at the Off-Air bar and he tells them he is going to Bali, but Ben takes his passport. Angus decides to hitch a ride to the airport and Xanthe goes with him, assuming that he has done it before. After becoming scared of the man who picked them up, Angus and Xanthe flee and her father, Gary Canning (Damien Richardson) takes them home. A few days later, Sarah returns to see Angus and apologises for not telling him about her cancer. She asks him to come to Germany with her, where she will continue her treatment. Angus asks if he can stay with Karl and Susan. However, after talking with his mother and realising that he did not cause her cancer, he agrees to go with her and they leave for Germany.

Weeks later, while he is on the Gold Coast with his father, Angus is reunited with Ben and Xanthe, after finding them on the beach. When he learns Madison Robinson (Sarah Ellen) is late for a singing audition, Angus fills in to by her more time. After speaking with Susan about how he has been effected by his mother's condition, she invites him to return to Erinsborough and he accepts. Susan's niece Elly Conway (Jodi Anasta) persuades Angus to return to school and he develops a crush on her. After Elly rejects Angus, he loses his virginity to Piper Willis (Mavournee Hazel), who also lost her virginity to him. He later decides to get a tattoo using Ned Willis's (Ben Hall) stolen ink, but Karl stops him as the ink is contaminated. Angus sings to Elly at the Halloween dance, rousing Susan's suspicions. That same night, Angus kisses Elly while she is sleeping and she reprimands him, but decides not to tell Susan. Leo Tanaka (Tim Kano) warns Angus to stop pursuing Elly. Angus decides to leave Erinsborough High, but he is persuaded to attend a music school instead. His drink is spiked by one of his new school friends and he makes a drunken phone call to Elly, who picks him up from the bar, with help from Tyler Brennan (Travis Burns). Aaron Brennan (Matt Wilson) informs Angus that an independent record label want to meet with him after seeing his music video. Elly plans to meet up with her former boyfriend and Angus asks Piper for her help in keeping them apart, but the plan fails and Elly asks Angus to stay out of her life. Angus helps a drunk Elly to bed and takes advantage of her state to kiss her. Susan finds him lying next to her on the bed and reports the incident to the education board, who refer the case to the police. At the same time, Angus is offered a record deal. Angus and Elly tell Mark Brennan (Scott McGregor) that nothing happened between them, but Elly later remembers what happened in her bedroom. Angus begs her to keep quiet, but she tells Susan and Angus is questioned by the police again, where he faces assault charges. Angus apologises to Elly and explains that he knows what he did was wrong. She decides not to press charges, and Angus's father escorts him to Sydney.

Walter Mitchell

Walter Mitchell, played by Greg Stone, made his first screen appearance on 13 May 2016.  Walter was introduced as Sonya Rebecchi's (Eve Morey) estranged uncle. It soon emerged that Walter was hiding a secret from Sonya concerning the night her parents died in a car crash. He eventually revealed that he was actually Sonya's father. Furthermore, Sonya also learned Walter had a fourteen-year-old daughter called Zoe (Nicola Billie Gullotti). Sonya's half-sister suffers from leukaemia and Walter asks Sonya to get tested as Zoe needs a bone-marrow transplant. Daniel Kilkelly of Digital Spy branded Walter a "troubled relative", while an All About Soap columnist called him "cunning".

Walter arrives in Erinsborough, and Toadie tries to stop him meeting Sonya. Walter assures Toadie that he is three weeks sober, but he lent the money Toadie gave him to a friend instead of going to rehab. Toadie's friend Stephanie Scully (Carla Bonner) offers Walter a room at her motel. When Sonya arrives home early from a meeting, she meets Walter, but Toadie lies that Walter is one of his clients called Mitch. When she learns Mitch is an alcoholic, Sonya goes to an AA Meeting with him, where he meets Terese Willis (Rebekah Elmaloglou). Terese and Walter go for a drink and end up kissing. Sonya reveals that she has seen Mitch again, prompting Toadie to finally admit he is her uncle Walter. Sonya confronts Walter, who apologises for not finding her sooner, and though she tells him she cannot handle him in her life right now, he sticks around and continues to date Terese. Terese convinces Sonya to give Walter a second chance, but she becomes suspicious when she realises Walter was present in the car when her parents crashed and died. Walter reveals that he was arguing with his brother John, as he wanted Sonya to know he was actually her father, due to a brief affair between him and Sonya's mother.

Sonya is shocked and initially rejects Walter, prompting him to get drunk. When Sonya finds him, she agrees to help him get clean and invites him to move in. Walter breaks up with Terese and babysits Sonya's daughter Nell (Scarlett Anderson), impressing her, but she finds a text on his phone from his ex-wife Roxanne, urging him to be honest with Sonya about something. Walter admits that he has another daughter called Zoe, who has leukaemia. He asks Sonya to get tested to be a bone marrow donor. Sonya meets Zoe and gets tested, but they learn she is not a match. Walter then suggests that Nell could be a donor instead, and Sonya gets her tested in secret as Toadie objects. When she is found to be a match, Sonya tells Toadie, who refuses to let his daughter donate due to her young age. Walter collects Nell from nursery and takes her to the hospital. Realising what Walter has done, Zoe takes Nell back home. Walter apologises to Sonya and Toadie for kidnapping Nell, and Sonya decides not to press charges against him. When Sonya's son Callum (Morgan Baker) is found to be a match for Zoe, she and Walter leave for the United States. In 2018, Sonya learns that Zoe's cancer has returned and that chemotherapy is her only option left. Walter breaks his sobriety, so Sonya flies to the US to support him and he begins attending Alcoholics Anonymous meetings once more.

Mandy Franze

Mandy Franze, played by Kristy Best, made her first screen appearance on 26 May 2016. The character and Best's casting was announced on 1 May. Mandy is introduced as the "mysterious" former girlfriend of Andrew Morley's John Doe character, and a love rival for Paige Smith (Olympia Valance). 

Mandy claims to be John Doe's girlfriend. She tells him that his real name is Jason Jones and that they live together. She had just got back from a trip when she learned where he was and what had happened to him. John questions Mandy about his life with her and she explains that they met in Geelong and that he is a handyman. Paige Smith is suspicious of Mandy, but John continues to get to know her and they kiss. Before John and Mandy leave town, Paige brings over a Hawaiian pizza for them. Mandy claims that it is John's favourite, as he loves pineapple, making him realise that she is lying about their relationship, as he is allergic to pineapple. Before she goes, Mandy reveals that she met John on the day of the Lassiter's explosion, but he did not tell her his name or many details about himself.

James Udagawa

James Udagawa, played by Samuel David Humphrey, made his first screen appearance on 3 August 2016. The character and casting was announced on 25 July 2016. Humphrey, who has acrodysostosis, came to the attention of the casting directors after starring in a documentary about young people with physical disabilities. He was initially going to appear as an extra, but "a more substantial role" was later written for him. Of his casting, Humphrey stated "I love the whole process and I've learnt so much on Neighbours. I want to keep improving my skills and hopefully inspire other people to chase their dreams." James was billed as a "corporate whizz kid" and "highly-intelligent". He is brought in to help save Lassiter's Hotel from financial ruin and rein in Terese Willis (Rebekah Elmaloglou).

James joins Terese Willis in the lift at Lassiter's Hotel, where she mistakes him for a child due to his shortened height and directs him to the children's activity centre. When James later comes to Terese's office, she asks if he is lost and whether she can contact his parents. He then informs her that he is here to see her and the hotel's books, as he is a representative of his family's company, who have invested in the hotel. He explains that he wanted to experience the hotel as a guest and jokingly tells Terese that the children's activity centre is great. He asks to see the accounts, Terese's projections for the next year and the supplier contracts. A couple of weeks later, James returns for The Waterhole's quarterly review and to discuss the hidden cameras found in the hotel rooms. Elly Conway (Jodi Anasta) interrupts the meeting to explain that the cameras were part of a school media project and she apologises for it getting out of hand. James is satisfied with the explanation. Mr. Udagawa surprises Terese with his appearance a few weeks later. He lets her know that the figures for the Lassiter's pigeon race were satisfactory. Sheila Canning (Colette Mann) brings over a stock report for The Waterhole, which Udagawa takes from her. He tells Terese the takings are stagnant and demands to know what her plan is to improve them. James later confides in Terese that his sister Jasmine (Kaori Maeda-Judge) intends to usurp control of their family's company upon their grandfather's death. Jasmine manipulates their grandfather into relocating James, and he warns Terese to be careful around Jasmine.

David Tanaka

David Tanaka, played by Takaya Honda, made his first screen appearance on 21 September 2016. The character and Honda's casting was announced on 22 August 2016, along with Tim Kano who plays David's twin brother Leo Tanaka. Of his casting, Honda said, "I feel so privileged to have the opportunity to join the regular cast of Neighbours. To learn from such prominent and longstanding Australian talent is truly seeing my dreams fulfilled." David and Leo come to Erinsborough in the hope of solving "a family mystery". David is a doctor, who has "a social conscience".

Leo Tanaka

Leo Tanaka, played by Tim Kano, made his first screen appearance on 22 September 2016. The character and Kano's casting was announced on 22 August 2016, along with Takaya Honda who plays Leo's twin brother David Tanaka. Kano enjoyed portraying his character, saying "I'm loving the role of Leo, who is such a great character to play." The Tanaka brothers come to Erinsborough in the hope of solving "a family mystery". Unlike his doctor brother, Leo is an opportunist. Kano described the character as being superficial, "fun and cheeky". He also has "a good heart" and respects his brother.

Brooke Butler

Brooke Butler, played by Fifi Box, made her first screen appearance on 28 September 2016. The character and Box's casting was announced on 18 July 2016. She began filming her first scenes during the same week. Of her casting, Box commented, "I'm so excited to be heading to Ramsay Street to join the Neighbours family. Acting has been a lifelong dream of mine and to get this opportunity on Australia's most loved and popular show has blown my mind. I'm too excited for words!" Executive producer Jason Herbison praised Box's audition and said she won the role after showing that she "could pull off Gold Coast chic". Brooke is the estranged mother of Xanthe Canning (Lily Van der Meer) and ex-partner of Gary Canning (Damien Richardson). She was billed as "an opportunistic, flighty and dubious woman who relies on her looks to get by." Network Ten Executive Producer Claire Tonkin added that Brooke would be a "colourful character". In December 2016, Herbison confirmed that Brooke would return during 2017. She returned during the episode broadcast on 12 April.

Near their old Gold Coast apartment, Brooke sits in her car and watches her daughter Xanthe and Ben Kirk (Felix Mallard). Weeks later, Brooke comes to Erinsborough to reconnect with Xanthe. She is also reunited with her former partner Gary and meets his mother Sheila Canning (Colette Mann). Brooke apologises to Xanthe for leaving her for so long, but explains that she was being chased by several men that she had conned. Xanthe realises that Brooke has been in Perth with her half-sister Jessie the whole time. Brooke apologises for not being there for Xanthe. Brooke reveals that she has a business selling jewellery, but Sheila is suspicious of her timing, as the family have just won a cash prize on Family Feud. She later takes a pair of Brooke's sample earrings to get them valued, and when she learns that they are legitimate, Sheila apologises. Xanthe encourages her mother to host a jewellery party for their neighbours, where Brooke makes several sales. She later meets with Mack Sweetin (Brian Edmond), to whom she owes money, and asks for the jewellery order to be delayed, as she does not want the buyers to know they are getting fakes until she has convinced Xanthe to leave town with her. Ben sees Mack hand over the jewellery to Brooke, but she denies receiving the shipment. She then convinces Xanthe that Ben does not respect her, and the couple fall out.

Gary and Brooke reconcile their relationship, but Xanthe thinks Brooke is using her father. Gary confronts Brooke, but she convinces him that she has feelings for him. Mack warns Brooke that she is late with her repayment. Brooke manipulates Gary and Xanthe by saying Sheila is looking tired from looking after the house, working and caring for a teenager. She adds extra chilli powder to Sheila's meal, leading to her brief hospitalisation with indigestion. Karl Kennedy (Alan Fletcher) enquires about his jewellery order and Brooke lies that she has not received it yet. She later tells Gary that customs are holding the order and she has to pay a $2000 fee, so Gary lends her the money. Brooke arranges to take Xanthe to Perth for a holiday. Shortly before they leave, Brooke's former boyfriend Trey Johnson (Jason Buckley) turns up, demanding the money Brooke stole from him. Brooke repays him and he leaves. Brooke tells Xanthe, Gary and Sheila that she is in debt and that the jewellery is fake. Mack turns up to collect Brooke's latest repayment and Sheila pays him. She tells Brooke that she will organise some shifts at The Waterhole for her. However, Brooke later writes Xanthe a goodbye letter and leaves town. She later calls Xanthe, but hangs up without speaking to her.

Brooke returns to Erinsborough and applies for a job at the hospital, but Sheila ruins her chances. Brooke apologises to the Canning's neighbours for the jewellery scam and promises to pay them back when she gets a job. Terese gives Brooke a three-month trial as the manager of Lassiter's Day Spa. She also sets Brooke up on a date with Paul Robinson (Stefan Dennis). Brooke and Gary come up with a plan for Brooke to meet her daughter, Jesse, when she stops over in Melbourne on the way to Malaysia. When Terese sees Gary with Brooke, she thinks that Gary is cheating on her. Brooke and Gary wait outside a hotel where they think Jesse is staying, but Brooke receives a text message saying that she is at a different hotel. Brooke hopes to get back together with Gary, but when Gary and Terese become engaged, Brooke decides to leave for Malaysia to meet up with Jesse, after Sheila offers to pay her fare.

Others

References

External links
 Characters and cast at the Official Neighbours website
 Characters and cast at the Internet Movie Database

2016
Neighbours
2016 in Australian television